Aryl hydrocarbon receptor nuclear translocator 2 is a protein that in humans is encoded by the ARNT2 gene.

This gene encodes a member of the basic-helix-loop-helix-Per-Arnt-Sim (bHLH-PAS) superfamily of transcription factors. The encoded protein acts as a partner for several sensor proteins of the bHLH-PAS family, forming heterodimers with the sensor proteins that bind regulatory DNA sequences in genes responsive to developmental and environmental stimuli. Under hypoxic conditions, the encoded protein complexes with hypoxia-inducible factor 1alpha in the nucleus and this complex binds to hypoxia-responsive elements in enhancers and promoters of oxygen-responsive genes. A highly similar protein in mouse forms functional complexes with both aryl hydrocarbon receptors and Single-minded proteins, suggesting addition roles for the encoded protein in the metabolism of xenobiotic compounds and the regulation of neurogenesis, respectively.

References

External links

Further reading

PAS-domain-containing proteins